Polić is a Serbo-Croatian surname, worn by ethnic Croats and Serbs, found in the former Yugoslav republics of Bosnia and Herzegovina, Croatia, Montenegro and Serbia. The surname may refer to:

 Gordana–Nadežda Polić, known as Ana Bekuta (born 1959), Serbian singer
 Vladimir Polić (1916–1972), Yugoslav waterpolo player
 Antica Polić, Croatian and Indian swimmer and swimming coach
 Damir Polić, Croatian water polo player
 Dora Polić (born 1971), Croatian actress
 Ladislav Polić (1874–1874), Croatian lawyer and politician
 Mate Polić (1843–1917), Croatian shipowner
 Milutin Polić (1883–1908), Croatian composer
 Nikola Polić (journalist) (1842–1902), Croatian journalist
 Nikola Polić (poet) (1890–1960), Croatian poet
 Janko Polić Kamov (1886–1910), Croatian writer

See also
Poljić, surname
Palić, surname
Pelić, surname
Pilić, surname
Pulić, surname

References

Croatian surnames
Serbian surnames